Sattagydia (Old Persian: 𐎰𐎫𐎦𐎢𐏁 Thataguš, country of the "hundred cows") was one of the easternmost regions of the Achaemenid Empire, part of its Seventh tax district according to Herodotus, along with Gandārae, Dadicae and Aparytae. It was situated east of the Sulaiman Mountains up to the Indus River in the basin around Bannu in modern day's southern Khyber Pakhtunkhwa, Pakistan.

Geography
The location of Sattagydia has been subject to debate. Its association with Gandara in the 7th tax district of the Herodotus list implies that it was close to Gandara. Olmstead believed that it stretched from "the lower slopes of the Hindu Kush". Based on these considerations, two locations have been proposed: the first being "the area of the confluence of the Ghorband and Panjshir rivers in Afghanistan", and the second, "the area of the middle Indus, around the modern city of Bannu".

Following recent archaeological findings, the Bannu basin has become the favoured choice. David Fleming points out that it is close to Kurram and Tochi rivers and it has four routes to the west, via the Khyber Pass, the Kurram river valley, the Gomal Pass and the Bolan Pass in Balochistan. Magee et al. have reported findings of recent archaeological excavations at Akra, noting that it was a large urban site that existed throughout the Iron Age and had trade relations with Central Asia.

People

Representatives of Sattagydia are depicted as delegates bringing gifts to the king on the Apadana staircases, and as throne/ dais bearers on the Tripylon and Hall of One Hundred Columns reliefs at Persepolis. The representatives of Sattagydia are characterized by their loincloths, sandals, and exposed upper body, which distinguish them from the representatives of other eastern provinces such as Bactria and Arachosia.

History
Sattagydia is mentioned for the first time in the Behistun inscription of Darius the Great as one of the provinces in revolt while the king was in Babylon. The revolt was presumably suppressed in 515 BCE. The satrapy disappears from sources after 480 BCE, possible being mentioned by another name or included with other regions.

After being conquered  by Alexander the Great, Sattagydia became part of the Seleucid Empire. Under the Seleucids this area was adjacent to Sind, which was itself adjacent to  Abiria (corresponding roughly to Rajasthan), with the coastal region being called Syrastrene. The area was taken from the Seleucids by the Mauryans under Chandragupta in 316 BCE.
And, beginning in the 1st century BC, the area was incorporated into the burgeoning Kushan empire, referred to as "Scythia" in the Periplus.

References

Bibliography

External links
 "Sattygydia" Livius: Articles on Ancient History

Achaemenid satrapies
Geographic history of Pakistan